Danny Reible is an American engineer, currently the Donovan Maddox Distinguished Engineering Chair and Paul Whitfield Horn Professor at Texas Tech University. He was previously the Director of the Center for Research for Water Resources and Bettie Margaret Smith Chaired Professor at University of Texas at Austin, the Director of the Hazardous Substance Research Center/South and Southwest and Chevron Professor at Louisiana State University and also the Shell Professor of Environmental Engineering at University of Sydney. He is a Fellow of the American Association for the Advancement of Science and the American Institute of Chemical Engineers.  In 2005 he was elected a member of the National Academy of Engineering for "the development of widely used means of managing contaminated sediments". He is a Board Certified Environmental Engineer of the American Academy of Environmental Engineers and Scientists and the 2017 Kappe Lecturer. He is the author of Fundamentals of Environmental Engineering and a coauthor of Diffusion Models of Environmental Transport and editor of four other books.

References

American chemical engineers
Texas Tech University faculty
California Institute of Technology alumni
Lamar University alumni
Living people
Fellows of the American Institute of Chemical Engineers
1954 births